South Milwaukee is a city in Milwaukee County, Wisconsin, United States. The population was 20,795 at the 2020 census.

History
South Milwaukee was laid out in 1891 by the South Milwaukee company within the Town of Oak Creek, with the purpose of serving as a rival industrial suburb of the City of Milwaukee, and was named from its location south of Milwaukee. South Milwaukee was incorporated as a village in 1892, then as a city in 1897. South Milwaukee has a rich immigrant history, as immigrants from England and Germany made up a large portion of the population in the early 1900s.

Geography

South Milwaukee is located at  (42.911016, −87.864030).

Demographics

2010 census
As of the census of 2010, there were 21,156 people, 9,043 households, and 5,475 families living in the city. The racial makeup of the city was 91.6% White, 2.0% African American, 0.8% Native American, 1.1% Asian, 2.1% from other races, and 2.2% from two or more races. Hispanic or Latino of any race were 8.0% of the population.

There were 9,043 households, of which 28.5% had children under the age of 18 living with them, 43.3% were married couples living together, 11.9% had a female householder with no husband present, 5.4% had a male householder with no wife present, and 39.5% were non-families. 32.8% of all households were made up of individuals, and 12.7% had someone living alone who was 65 years of age or older. The average household size was 2.31 and the average family size was 2.93.

The median age in the city was 40.3 years. 21.8% of residents were under the age of 18; 8.4% were between the ages of 18 and 24; 26% were from 25 to 44; 28.1% were from 45 to 64; and 15.6% were 65 years of age or older. The gender makeup of the city was 49.0% male and 51.0% female.

2000 census
As of the census of 2000, there were 21,256 people, 8,694 households, and 5,616 families living in the city. The population density was 4,447.5 people per square mile (1,716.9/km2). There were 9,122 housing units at an average density of 1,908.6 per square mile (736.8/km2). The racial makeup of the city was 94.81% White, 1.04% African American, 0.58% Native American, 0.69% Asian, 0.04% Pacific Islander, 1.36% from other races, and 1.47% from two or more races. Hispanic or Latino of any race were 4.01% of the population.

There were 8,694 households, out of which 30.2% had children under the age of 18 living with them, 49.8% were married couples living together, 10.7% had a female householder with no husband present, and 35.4% were non-families. 30.1% of all households were made up of individuals, and 11.2% had someone living alone who was 65 years of age or older. The average household size was 2.40 and the average family size was 3.00.

In the city, the population was spread out, with 23.9% under the age of 18, 8.0% from 18 to 24, 30.3% from 25 to 44, 21.1% from 45 to 64, and 16.6% who were 65 years of age or older. The median age was 38 years. For every 100 females, there were 94.5 males. For every 100 females age 18 and over, there were 91.9 males.

The median income for a household in the city was $44,197, and the median income for a family was $54,474. Males had a median income of $38,146 versus $27,121 for females. The per capita income for the city was $20,925. About 4.5% of families and 6.0% of the population were below the poverty line, including 7.5% of those under age 18 and 6.6% of those age 65 or over.

Economy
South Milwaukee was the headquarters of Bucyrus International, formerly Bucyrus-Erie, which is known for constructing large shovels and dragline excavators, including Big Muskie, the world's largest mobile earth-moving machine. Bucyrus shovels were used in the construction of the Panama Canal.

In November 2012 Caterpillar Mining bought Bucyrus International for $8.6 billion and will make a goal to become a "one-stop shop" for mining companies worldwide.

Recreation
Within South Milwaukee's borders is Grant Park, part of the Milwaukee County Park System. Grant Park features the Oak Leaf Bike trail, tennis courts, a swimming beach, an 18-hole golf course and the Seven Bridges Hiking Trail along the shore of Lake Michigan.

In 2005, the South Milwaukee Performing Arts Center was built adjacent to the new South Milwaukee High School. This Performing Arts Center, which is open to the public, hosts a variety of entertainment.

Transportation
South Milwaukee was served by passenger rail until 1971, via the South Milwaukee Passenger Station. Today, the former depot is listed on the National Register of Historic Places. Freight railroad services are provided by the Union Pacific Railroad.

Notable people

 William P. Atkinson, member of the Wisconsin State Assembly
 Greg Brower, member of the Nevada State Senate and former U.S. Attorney, born in South Milwaukee
 Jerry Dreva, avant-garde artist and leader of 1970s glam-rock group Les Petite Bon Bons
 John W. Grobschmidt, member of the Wisconsin State Assembly
 Richard Grobschmidt, member of the Wisconsin State Assembly and Wisconsin State Senate, lived in South Milwaukee, graduated from South Milwaukee High School
 Roger Sherman Hoar, Massachusetts State Senator and author who lived in South Milwaukee
 Jackie Kashian, comedian born in South Milwaukee and graduated from South Milwaukee High School
 Reginald Lisowski, American professional wrestler, better known by his ring name, "The Crusher"
 Kurt Nimphius, NBA player born in South Milwaukee and graduated from South Milwaukee High School
 Jeff Plale, Wisconsin Railroad Commissioner and former legislator
 Phil Sobocinski, NFL player, was born in South Milwaukee
 George Sokolowski, Wisconsin State Representative, was born in South Milwaukee
 Gary George Wetzel, Medal of Honor recipient, was born in South Milwaukee
 Chester Yorton, former Mr. America and Mr. Universe, grew up in South Milwaukee
 Chuck Zehner, former host of the PBS series Tracks Ahead, lived in South Milwaukee

References

External links
 City of South Milwaukee

Cities in Wisconsin
Cities in Milwaukee County, Wisconsin
Articles containing video clips
Wisconsin populated places on Lake Michigan
1891 establishments in Wisconsin